The Winter Vault is Anne Michaels' second novel.

Background
Michaels had started writing The Winter Vault before her breakout debut novel, 1997's Fugitive Pieces. The novel deals with topics of disenfranchisement and loss, and like Fugitive Pieces, it is written in a poetic, lyric style.

Plot
The Winter Vault is the story of Avery and Jean, who are living in Egypt in 1964 when the great temple at Abu Simbel must be rescued from the rising waters behind the Aswan Dam. Avery is overseeing how the temple is taken apart and rebuilt again.

Reception
The Winter Vault was praised by critics at outlets including The New York Times, The Guardian, and The Globe and Mail.

References

2009 Canadian novels
Novels by Anne Michaels
Novels set in Egypt
Fiction set in 1964
Novels set in the 1960s
Aswan
Lake Nasser
McClelland & Stewart books
Abu Simbel